Jaine Stiven Barreiro Solis (born 19 June 1994) is a Colombian professional footballer who plays for Liga MX club León.

Honours
Léon
Liga MX: Guardianes 2020
Leagues Cup: 2021

Individual
Liga MX Best XI: Guardianes 2020

References

1994 births
Living people
Colombian footballers
Colombia youth international footballers
Colombian expatriate footballers
Association football defenders
Categoría Primera A players
Categoría Primera B players
Liga MX players
Deportes Quindío footballers
Independiente Santa Fe footballers
Atlas F.C. footballers
C.F. Pachuca players
Club León footballers
Colombian expatriate sportspeople in Mexico
Expatriate footballers in Mexico
Footballers from Cali